Martin Garner may refer to:
 Martin Garner (ornithologist), British ornithologist and Christian evangelist
 Martin Garner (actor), American film and television actor

See also
 Marty Garner, American professional wrestler